Barry Curtin (born 30 June 1951) is an Australian cricketer. He played twenty first-class matches for South Australia between 1972 and 1978. His brothers, Paul and Peter, also played first-class cricket for South Australia.

See also
 List of South Australian representative cricketers

References

External links
 

1951 births
Living people
Australian cricketers
South Australia cricketers
Cricketers from Adelaide